Spartan Stadium may refer to:
 Spartan Stadium (East Lansing, Michigan), stadium on the campus of Michigan State University
 Spartan Municipal Stadium, stadium in Portsmouth, Ohio
 CEFCU Stadium, stadium on the campus of San José State University, which was called Spartan Stadium from 1933 to 2016.